Al Qor is a settlement in Ras Al Khaimah, United Arab Emirates (UAE). The area is rich in archaeological sites and finds date human settlement back to the Umm Al Nar period – 2600 BCE. Al Qor is located within the Wadi Qor and is prone to intense flooding. It was traditionally home to the Bani Kaab tribe.

References

Villages in the United Arab Emirates
Populated places in the Emirate of Ras Al Khaimah